Mari Skurdal (born 6 September 1977) is a Norwegian journalist and newspaper editor.

Background
She was born in Oslo and is educated from the University of Oslo. She is a co-author of several textbooks for secondary school, and worked as teacher in secondary school until she started working as journalist for the newspaper Klassekampen.

Editor of Klassekampen
After ten years in diffent leading positions in Klassekampen (the last position being feature editor), Skurdal in 2018 was appointed chief editor of the paper.

She was honoured as Editor of the year 2022 by Oslo Redaktørforening (the Oslo Association of Editors).

In 2021 she was criticized for the paper's coverage of transgender people by journalism lecturer Jon Martin Larsen who wrote that he fears her articles contribute to "incitement and hatred against transgender people." In 2022 Larsen wrote that Klassekampen "tramples on" transgender people and that he cautions his students against the paper. Skurdal has denied the accusation that the paper is transphobic.

References

1977 births
Living people
Journalists from Oslo
University of Oslo alumni
Schoolteachers from Oslo
Norwegian newspaper editors
Women newspaper editors
Norwegian textbook writers
Norwegian women non-fiction writers
Women textbook writers
Klassekampen editors